John Leonard Gibby (17 October 1920 – 21 October 1971) was an Australian rules footballer who played with Footscray in the Victorian Football League (VFL).

Family
The son of John Gibby (1889–1961), and Mary Elizabeth "Maie" Gibby (1893–1976), née Dodd, John Leonard Gibby was born at Kew, Victoria on 17 October 1920.

He married Margaret Catherine "Peg" Ryan (1919–?) in 1946.

Football

Footscray (VFL)
Having played in a number of Second XVIII matches earlier in the season, he played in five consecutive First XVIII matches for Footscray in 1942: the first, against St Kilda, at the Yarravile Oval, on 11 July 1942, and the last, against Hawthorn, at the Yarravile Oval, on 8 August 1942.

Military service
He enlisted in the RAAF on 9 October 1942, served overseas, and was discharged on 6 December 1945.

Death
He died on 21 October 1971.

Notes

References
 
 World War Two Nominal Roll: Flying Officer John Lennard Gibby (419935), Department of Veterans' Affairs.
 World War Two Service Record: Flying Officer John Lennard Gibby (419935), National Archives of Australia.

External links 

1920 births
1971 deaths
Australian rules footballers from Melbourne
Western Bulldogs players
Royal Australian Air Force personnel of World War II
Royal Australian Air Force officers
People from Kew, Victoria
Military personnel from Melbourne